Anania caudatella is a moth in the family Crambidae. It was described by Harrison Gray Dyar Jr. in 1912. It is found in Mexico.

References

Moths described in 1912
Pyraustinae
Moths of Central America